Parkindale is a dispersed Canadian rural community located in the Elgin Parish of Albert County, New Brunswick.

Centered on Route 895, the Parkindale region, along with the Prosser Brook region, is home to the Kent Hills Wind Farm, a large wind farm project.

History

Notable people

See also
List of communities in New Brunswick

Neighbouring communities
Elgin
Prosser Brook

References

Communities in Albert County, New Brunswick